The Children's Code or Age Appropriate Design Code is a code of practice and set of standards for electronic information services, requiring that they treat children and their data in an appropriate way.  It was published by the Information Commissioner's Office (ICO), taking effect from September 2021.  Even though the ICO is a UK regulatory agency, the code applies across the Internet and so major global providers such as Facebook, Google and TikTok are complying as they are subject to audit and investigation.

Penalties
Penalties for non-compliance are similar to those of the General Data Protection Regulation and so include fines of up to 4% of global turnover.

See also
 Advertising to children
 Children's Online Privacy Protection Act
 Online Safety Bill

References

Child welfare
Information governance